Anemosa isadasalis is a species of snout moth in the genus Anemosa. It was described by Francis Walker, in 1859, and is known from Australia.

References

Moths described in 1859
Chrysauginae
Moths of Australia